Texas State University is a public research university with its main campus (San Marcos campus) located in the southern portion of the Austin metropolitan area, and its Round Rock campus in the northern portion. Since its establishment in 1899, the university has grown to the fifth largest university in the state of Texas and the 28th largest university in the United States. Texas State University reached a record enrollment of 38,808 students in the 2016 fall semester, continuing a trend of enrollment growth over several years. The university offers more than 200 degree options from its ten colleges.

Texas State is classified among "R2: Doctoral Universities – High research activity" and an Emerging Research University (ERU) by the State of Texas. The university is designated as a Hispanic-Serving Institution (HSI) by the U.S. Department of Education. Texas State is accredited by the Southern Association of Colleges and Schools (SACS). Faculty from the various colleges have consistently been granted Fulbright Scholarships
resulting in Texas State's being recognized as one of the top producing universities of Fulbright Scholars. The 36th president of the United States, Lyndon B. Johnson, graduated from the institution in 1930; Texas State University is the only college or university in Texas to have a U.S. president as an alumnus.

Additionally, it has a  satellite campus at the Texas State University Round Rock Campus (RRC) in the greater north Austin area. The university operates the  Science, Technology and Advanced Research (STAR) Park, a technology commercialization and applied research facility. Texas State has  additional acres of recreational, instructional, farm, and ranch land. The Forensic Anthropology Center at Texas State is the largest forensics research facility in the world.

Texas State University's intercollegiate sports teams, commonly known as the Bobcats, compete in National Collegiate Athletic Association (NCAA) Division I and the Sun Belt Conference.

History
The Southwest Texas State Normal School was proposed in a March 3, 1899, bill by state representative Fred Cocke.  Cocke represented the citizens of Hays and surrounding counties where the school was to be located.  While there was opposition to the bill, with the support of State Senator J.B. Dibrell, it was finally passed and signed into law on May 10, 1899, by Governor Joseph D. Sayers.  The school's purpose was to provide manual training and teach domestic sciences and agriculture.  Any students earning a diploma and teaching certificate from the school would be authorized to teach in the state's public schools.  In October 1899, the San Marcos City Council voted to donate  of land at what was known as Chautauqua Hill for the school to be built on.  It was not until 1901 that the Texas legislature accepted this donation and approved $25,000 to be used for construction of buildings on the site.  The building now known as Old Main was completed and the school opened its doors to its first enrollment of 303 students in September 1903.

In 1912, the San Marcos School Board began a partnership with the school to allow Southwest Texas State Normal School students to instruct local school children as part of their training to become teachers.  The San Marcos East End Ward School, comprising the first eight grades of the school district, was moved onto the Southwest Texas State campus in 1917.  In 1935, a formal contract between Southwest Texas State Teachers College, as it was known then, and the San Marcos school district for the "Public Schools [to become] the laboratory school for said Teachers College."  The school would be under the control and supervision of the city of San Marcos but Southwest Texas State was responsible for providing and maintaining buildings and equipment for the city's elementary and junior high schools.

The college enrolled its first African-American students in 1963, following a federal lawsuit brought by Dana Smith, who became one of the first five African Americans at the institution when a district court judge ruled that they could not be denied admission based on race.

On November 8, 1965, the school's most famous alumnus, United States president Lyndon B. Johnson, returned to his alma mater to sign the Higher Education Act of 1965 a part of the Great Society programs.  In a speech, held in the old Strahan Gymnasium on the school's campus (now the Music Building), prior to signing the bill, he recounted his own difficulties affording to go to college: having to shower and shave in the school's gymnasium, living above a faculty member's garage, and working multiple jobs.

On November 13, 1969, ten students were suspended from Texas State for protesting the Vietnam war. They became known as the "San Marcos 10." They appealed their expulsion through the normal school channels and then filed a lawsuit against the president of the university, the dean of students and the Texas State University system Board of Regents. They were reinstated via injunction and attended classes while their case moved through the courts. When their appeals were rejected, they submitted their case to the U.S. Supreme Court, but only Justice William Douglas voted to hear their argument so the decisions of the lower courts stood. The San Marcos 10 subsequently lost all of the credits for the semesters they completed while their lawsuit moved through the court system.

Expansion
The campus has grown substantially from its original 11 acres in 1899.  During the first 40 years of the school's history, the campus was expanded to accommodate 18 buildings around the original Main Building.  These buildings included academic buildings, a library, buildings to house the San Marcos school students, dormitories, a dining hall, and men's and women's gymnasiums.  In 1926, 90 acres of land adjacent to the San Marcos River was purchased by A. B. Rogers to build a hotel, glass-bottom boat rides and other water-based attractions to become the Aquarena Springs theme park.  The university bought the property in 1994 intending to use the land as a research and education center.  In 2002, this piece of land became known as the River System Institute and offered educational tours including a wetlands boardwalk and continued to offer glass-bottom boat rides.

In 1996, the school began offering courses in Round Rock, Texas, on the campus of Westwood High School. It originally offered night classes that allowed students to earn graduate degrees in business administration and education.

Name changes
The school's name has changed several times over the course of its history.  The first change occurred in 1918 when Southwest Texas State Normal School became Southwest Texas State Normal College, after the Board of Regents, two years earlier, had authorized the school to begin granting degrees as a senior college. In 1921, a statewide effort was launched to improve academic standards in Texas normal schools to meet more closely the requirements of the University of Texas.  These improvements prompted a second name change in 1923, when the Texas Legislature renamed the school Southwest Texas State Teachers College.  Another change occurred in 1959, with the school becoming Southwest Texas State College.  Ten years later, the legislature renamed the school Southwest Texas State University.

In 2003, members of the school's Associated Student Government (ASG), approached state senator Jeff Wentworth asking that the school be renamed Texas State University at San Marcos.  The ASG had unanimously approved a resolution supporting the change, arguing that the current name reflected a regionalism that was not aligned with the university's effort to reach top-tier status.  The ASG further said that donations from the school's alumni would pay for implementing the name change so that state tax dollars would not be required. Some students and alumni protested the change, pointing out that no vote had been taken on the matter. A bill, sponsored by Senator Wentworth, was passed and on September 1, 2003, the school became known as Texas State University–San Marcos.  The city was originally included in the name to differentiate it from other schools in the Texas State University System, which were, at the time, expected to change their names to Texas State University (e.g. Texas State University–Lamar).  Those changes did not occur, however, and after Texas State continued to expand its campus in Round Rock, the university requested that the name of the city be removed from the school's name. In 2013, under the McDaniel-Sibley ASG Administration, Associated Student Government senator Quentin De La Garza continued the efforts to have the name changed. A bill to accomplish that change was passed by the Eighty-third Texas Legislature and signed by the governor. The name was officially changed on September 1, 2013, for the sixth time in the school's history.

2019 sexual assault controversies
In the fall of 2019, the US Department of Education opened a formal review into Texas State University's compliance with a federal crime-reporting statute meant to provide information about campus safety. Texas State University officials acknowledged in September 2019 that it seriously under-reported the number of rapes and other crimes on campus in recent years. A former university police chief and his top deputy were also accused of hiring unqualified officers to patrol the San Marcos campus, including one who allegedly slept with a sexual assault victim while investigating her case.

Campus

The Texas State University main campus is located in San Marcos, Texas, midway between Austin and San Antonio along Interstate 35. It spans , including the original land donated by the city of San Marcos consisting of Chautauqua Hill on which Old Main still sits.

The Quad is the heart of campus because it is surrounded by a majority of the academic buildings and is near the bus loop where most of the university bus routes stop on campus.  Since many students pass through the quad, it is the primary gathering place for student organizations, which often set up booths and tables promoting fundraisers and events.  The west end of the Quad has a 17-foot high aluminum sculpture of two horses, called The Fighting Stallions.  This area has been designated as the university's free speech zone and was subject to one of the first court challenges to the creation of such zones after the suspension of ten students protesting the Vietnam War.  The east end of the Quad rises to the top of the highest hill on campus where the university's oldest building, Old Main, sits.

The main campus in San Marcos served as the location of the fictional school TMU (Texas Methodist University) in the NBC TV series Friday Night Lights.

Old Main

Built in 1903 and originally called the Main Building, Old Main was the first building on the campus. The design was closely patterned on the Old Main Building of 1889 at Sam Houston State University, designed by Alfred Muller of Galveston.  Fourteen years later, E. Northcraft, the engineer for the building at Sam Houston, oversaw construction of the Texas State University Main Building, a red-gabled Victorian Gothic structure.  It was added to the National Register of Historic Places in 1983.  In more than a century of use, and through many renovations, the building has served varied purposes, from being the university's administration building to an auditorium and chapel to now housing the offices for the School of Journalism and Mass Communication as well as the offices of the College of Fine Arts and Communication.

Alkek Library

The university's library was named in 1991 for an alumnus, Albert B. Alkek, who became an oilman, rancher, and philanthropist. The Albert B. Alkek Library serves as the main academic library supporting the university community. It is a "select depository" for United States and Texas government documents, receiving a large number of government publications from the state and 60% of all federal publications. The library also encompasses special collections and papers, including the Wittliff collections; the largest US repository of contemporary Mexican photography; the King of the Hill archives; major collection of work by Cormac McCarthy, Sam Shepard, and Sandra Cisneros; and the Lonesome Dove miniseries collection.

Sewell Park

Sewell Park, located on the Texas State University campus on the banks of the San Marcos River in San Marcos, Texas, borders City Park, the San Marcos Mill Tract and Strahan Coliseum.  It was opened in 1917 by Southwest Texas State Normal School, and was called Riverside Park.  The land was owned by the U.S. Bureau of Fisheries and leased to the school.  It was originally used by students to learn how to swim and for general recreation.  The river banks were built up from the river bottom by university workers.  In 1949 the park was renamed Sewell Park in honor of S. M. Sewell, a mathematics professor who helped form the park.

A long time fixture of Sewell Park, local legend Dan Barry, better known as "Frisbee Dan", can be seen on just about any sunny day tossing his frisbee and keeping a watchful eye on the park.

Round Rock Campus

Originally known as the Round Rock Higher Education Center (RRHEC), the facility was opened in 1996 in temporary buildings with a small number of classes. By 2004, the fifteen temporary buildings, in a lot adjacent to Westwood High School, were full to capacity. A year earlier, the Avery family of Round Rock had donated 101 acres in northeast Round Rock to allow the former RRHEC to become its own campus. Construction of the Avery Building began in 2004, and the building opened its doors in August 2005. The 125,000-square-foot Avery Building was designed to offer instruction and student support in one building, with classrooms, labs, offices, and a library. In 2010 the Round Rock Campus opened the 77,740-square-foot, three-story Nursing Building. The St. David's School of Nursing admitted the first class of junior-level nursing majors in fall 2010. Ground Breaking for an additional health professions building occurred in May 2016. The building, known as Willow Hall, opened in 2018.

Curriculum 
The Round Rock Campus offers the junior and senior level classes to complete a bachelor's degree as well as graduate degrees, post baccalaureate certification, and continuing education programs. Students can complete their first two years at the Texas State University San Marcos campus or any community college, or transfer to the RRC from another school.  Students who complete requirements at the Round Rock Campus earn degrees from Texas State University.

Academics

Student body

As of the fall 2018 semester, Texas State University had a total enrollment of 38,694, continuing a trend of record enrollment growth over several years.  Of the student body, 31,032 are undergraduate students with the remaining 4,536 students being post-baccalaureate or graduate students. The university accepted 57.6% of freshmen applicants who applied to attend the fall 2012 semester. This includes the guaranteed acceptance of any Texas high school graduate with a grade point average that ranked them in the top 10% of their high school class.  Between 61% and 64% of undergraduate students earn their degree after six years. Hispanic students made up 30% of the student body in 2013, which increased to 32% in 2014, qualifying the university to be designated as a Hispanic-serving institution.  Additionally, the student body consists of approximately 55% female students, 80% students who live off-campus, and only 10% students who are members of a fraternity or sorority.

Rankings

In 2011 Texas State University was the 13th best four-year school for veterans according to Military Times EDGE magazine. In 2019 Washington Monthly ranked Texas State as 200th in the nation. Texas State University was included in The Best 386 Colleges: 2021 Edition published by The Princeton Review.

In the 2022 edition of the U.S. News & World Report ranking of the Best Global Universities Texas State University ranked 1647.

Colleges
Texas State University offers degrees in 98 bachelor programs, 93 master programs and 14 doctoral programs.  The university has been accredited by the Southern Association of Colleges and Schools since 1925 and had its last review in 2010.

These programs are offered through ten academic colleges, including:

Research
In January 2012, Texas State University was designated an emerging research university by the Texas Higher Education Coordinating Board. To achieve this status a university must spend at least $14 million in its research endeavors and either offer at least 10 doctoral degrees or have at least 150 enrolled doctoral students. Texas State has developed a series of 5-year plans that will make it eligible to receive funds from the National Research University Fund (NRUF).

One of Texas State's facilities includes its Center for Research Commercialization that was approved by the Texas State University System Regents in May 2011 with a focus on environmental sustainability and biotechnology.  The facility is funded through multiple grants including $1.8 million from the U.S. Economic Development Administration and $4.2 million from the Texas Emerging Technology Fund.  The facility will serve as a location for university faculty to perform advanced research and to commercialize that research into startup companies.

The Forensic Anthropology Center at Texas State is one of seven extant human decomposition research facilities (body farms) in the United States.  It is the largest such forensics research facility in the world.

In August 2012, Texas State's River Systems Institute was renamed The Meadows Center for Water and the Environment.  This name change was the result of donations totaling $5 million from The Meadows Foundation in Dallas, Texas.  The university plans on earning a total of $10 million from The Meadows Foundation and other sources for the center to study interactions between water and the overall environment. These studies include an examination of springs, drought and their effects on public water supplies. The center was founded in 2002 with funding, in part, from The Meadows Foundation. Since that time it has focused its research on the San Marcos Springs and Spring Lake, the second largest spring in the Southwest United States.

Faculty from the various college have consistently been awarded Fulbright Scholar grants
resulting in Texas State's being recognized as one of the top producing universities of Fulbright Scholars.

Extracurricular activities

Residential life
Approximately 20% of Texas State students live in on-campus or in university-owned housing including about 95% of freshman students.  Beginning in August 2012, there were approximately 6,353 beds in a variety of housing options including traditional dorms and apartment-style housing offered by the university.

Student organizations and Greek Life

Texas State University has more than 300 student organizations registered with its Student Involvement department. These organizations include Greek organizations, academic groups, honors societies, service groups, sports clubs, and common interest groups. Texas State has more than 30 fraternities and sororities, including 13 fraternities from the North American Interfraternity Conference, 9 fraternities and sororities from the historically African-American National Pan-Hellenic Council, 8 sororities from the National Panhellenic Conference, and 9 multicultural fraternities and sororities from the National Multicultural Greek Council. After the death of a Phi Kappa Psi pledge in November 2017, Texas State University halted all Greek life activities. Greek life activities resumed in March 2018, following a restructure of the university's Greek system.

Music groups, student government, performance groups 
The Bobcat Marching Band is the collegiate marching band of Texas State University. Nicknamed "The Pride of the Hill Country," the band began in 1919 as a casual association of student musicians on campus. It later evolved into a formal organization that performs at Texas State football games, NFL football games, professional soccer games, two presidential inaugurations, and a number of Hollywood movies and marching band oriented videos.

The school's student government is an organization of both undergraduate and graduate students who represent student's interests with the university administration. Student government has dealt with issues including concealed carry on campus and the university's anti-tobacco policy.  Student Government also administers a scholarship fund that any Texas State student can apply to earn.

A number of honors societies exists on campus including Golden Key and the Alpha Chi National College Honor Society.  Texas State was a charter member of Alpha Chi when it was created as the Scholarship Societies of the South in 1927. Texas State also has an active chapter of Alpha Phi Omega, National Service Fraternity.

The Texas State Strutters are a precision dance team formed in 1960, the first of its kind at a four-year institution in the United States.  The group performs to a variety of music including high kick, jazz, funk, and hip hop. The Strutters have performed nationally and internationally in 26 countries spanning 4 continents. Performances include two presidential inaugural parades, two Macy's Thanksgiving Day Parades, several NBA and NFL halftime shows, and America's Got Talent. They are the first university dance team to be invited to the People's Republic of China.

Bobcat Build is a yearly community service event that began in 2001 and is the largest such event run by students at the university.  Based upon Texas A&M University's "The Big Event", it allows student organizations and individual Texas State students to sign up to perform service projects throughout the San Marcos community.  The event has received recognition from state and national politicians including former State Representative Patrick Rose and U.S. Representative Lloyd Doggett.

Media
The oldest form of student media at Texas State was a yearbook originally called the Pedagogue and later renamed the Pedagog.  It was first published in 1904 and served to record each year's events through photographs and articles.  It was temporarily discontinued in 1975 due to a combination of the cost to publish the annual and a lack of student interest.  It was published again in 1978 as part of the school's seventy-fifth anniversary.  In 1984 it resumed regular publication.  However, it was last published in 2000 after university committees recommended replacing the printed yearbook with a video disk containing the same contents.  The annual has since been discontinued entirely.  Now called the University Star, it publishes coverage of the college's news, trends, opinions and sports.  The newspaper is published on Tuesdays while classes are in session in the fall and spring semesters. The paper is published five times during the summer. The Star has a web site which contains videos, blogs and podcasts in addition to the articles that are published in the print version of the paper. The Star and its staff have received awards including merits from Hearst Journalism, the Texas Intercollegiate Press Association and the Society of Professional Journalists.

Located in the Trinity Building, Texas State's FM radio station, KTSW, broadcasts at 89.9 MHz and provides sports coverage of Texas State Athletics and independent music. The KTSW website provides live-streaming broadcasts, and the Texas State television channel employs KTSW broadcasts as background music. KTSW's morning show, Orange Juice and Biscuits, gained recognition in 2007 for being a finalist in Collegiate Broadcasters Inc.'s "Best Regularly Scheduled Program" award.  In October 2008, as it was among Austin360.com's top ten-rated morning radio shows.

Athletics

Texas State currently competes at the NCAA Division I level and are members of the Sun Belt Conference. Texas State teams and athletes from multiple sports have won national and regional championships as well as medalists in the Olympic Games.

Mascot and logo
In 1920, Texas State adopted its first official mascot, the bobcat, at the urging of Oscar Strahan, who became the school's athletic director in 1919. Strahan suggested the bobcat because the cat is native to central Texas and is known for its ferocity. The bobcat did not get a name until 1964. At that time, Beth Greenlees won the Name the Bobcat contest with the name Boko the Bobcat.  The athletic logo, or spirit mark, is referred to as the SuperCat logo.  The current version of the logo was designed by a student in 2003. In August 2009, Texas State refined the logo with the addition of the Texas State lettering.

Rivalries
A thirteen-year rivalry with Nicholls State University ended with the 2011 football season.  It began in 1998 when the annual football game between the two schools was at first cancelled due to severe flooding in San Marcos, where the game was to be played.  The athletic directors and coaches later decided to postpone the game from October to November.  To remember those affected by the floods, including some people who had died in it, a wooden oar was made with each school's colors and initials.  The winning school would take possession of the oar for the next year and have the score inscribed on it.  This rivalry became known as the Battle for the Paddle.  The oar was last traded in 2010 when Nicholls State received it following 47–44 win over Texas State after four overtimes.  Prior to the schools' meeting in 2011, Rob Bernardi, the athletic director for Nicholls State, said that they would not be bringing the oar to San Marcos and would leave it on display in the Nicholls State athletic offices.  Due to Texas State changing conferences, Bernardi said it was unlikely that the schools will face each other in football again and that the rivalry was ending.

The rivalry with the University of Texas at San Antonio (UTSA) is dubbed the I-35 Showdown for the interstate highway that links San Marcos and San Antonio. A trophy consisting of an Interstate Highway 35 sign was originally given to the winner of the men's basketball game, but that tradition has been expanded to all sporting events between the two schools. Even though the two schools will be moving to different athletic conferences in 2013, Texas State Athletics Director Larry Ties expressed hope that the potential rivalry will still occur.

Texas State's only in-state Sun Belt conference rival is the University of Texas at Arlington (UT Arlington).  The rivalry never ceased as both schools moved from the Southland Conference to the Western Athletic Conference then on to the Sun Belt Conference.

Transition to FBS
In the summer of 2007, university president Denise Trauth created the Athletic Strategic Planning Committee with the purpose of evaluating a move for the football team to go to the Football Bowl Subdivision (FBS).  The committee released its final report in November 2007 which included a series of tasks that would need to be completed to make the move.  The university called its efforts The Drive to FBS.  Following the release of the committee's report, the university's Associated Student Government passed a bill for a student referendum to be held the following spring to obtain the student body's endorsement of an increase in fees to help pay for the move to the FBS.  In February 2008, almost 80% of the students who voted in the referendum, approved a raise in the athletics fee by $10 over the next five years. Another set of milestones for The Drive involved improvements to Texas State's football stadium, Bobcat Stadium.  Three phases of construction were completed to double the seating capacity of the stadium to 30,000, add luxury boxes, improvements to the press box, and replace the visitors' locker room.

Alumni

Texas State University's most notable alumnus is U.S. president Lyndon B. Johnson.  Johnson attended the university, then known as the Southwest Texas State Teachers College, from 1926 until 1930 when he earned his Bachelor of Science degree.  As a student, Johnson participated on the debate team and was an editor for the student newspaper, then known as the College Star. Johnson remains the only U.S. president who graduated from a university in the state of Texas.

Another notable alum is Grammy Award-winning American country music singer George Strait. Strait graduated in 1979 from the university, then known as Southwest Texas State University, with a Bachelor of Science in agriculture.  As a student, Strait performed his first show with the Ace in the Hole Band at Cheatham Street Warehouse in San Marcos.  In 2006, Strait was given an honorary Doctor of Humane Letters by University President Denise Trauth.

Other notable alumni include: General Robert L. Rutherford, United States Air Force; musician Scott H. Biram; actor Powers Boothe; writer Tomás Rivera; Texas state representative Alfred P.C. Petsch; columnist "Heloise" (Ponce Cruse Evans); mathematician and former president of the American Mathematical Society R. H. Bing; St. Louis Cardinals first baseman Paul Goldschmidt; professional wrestler Lance Archer (Lance Hoyt); Texas musician Charlie Robison; and military historian Alan C. Carey.

Notes

References

External links

 
 Texas State Athletics website

 
Public universities and colleges in Texas
Buildings and structures in San Marcos, Texas
Universities and colleges accredited by the Southern Association of Colleges and Schools
Education in Hays County, Texas
Educational institutions established in 1899
1899 establishments in Texas